Vidya Pratishthan's Kamalnayan Bajaj Institute of Engineering and Technology, formerly known as Vidya Pratishthan's College of Engineering, is a college under Pune University. It is located in Baramati, in Pune district.

External links
Official website

Engineering colleges in Maharashtra
Education in Pune district
Colleges affiliated to Savitribai Phule Pune University
Baramati